Griselda Frances Sinclair Pollock (born 11 March 1949) is an art historian and cultural analyst of international, postcolonial feminist studies in visual arts and visual culture. Since 1977, Pollock has been an influential scholar of modern art, avant-garde art, postmodern art, and contemporary art. She is a major influence in feminist theory, feminist art history, and gender studies. She is renowned for her innovative feminist approaches to art history which aim to deconstruct the lack of appreciation and importance of women in art as other than objects for the male gaze. 

Pollock conducts various studies that offer concrete historical analyses regarding the dynamics of the social structures that cause the sexual political environment within art history. Through her contributions to feminism, Pollock has written various texts exclusively focused on women in order to intentionally drift away from traditional art history, which concentrated primarily on the work of male artists due to its inherently sexist undertones. Pollock's initiative enabled long overdue exposure and appreciation needed for many female artists such as Mary Cassatt, Eva Hesse, and Charlotte Salomon. Her theoretical and methodological innovations which were first released up to three decades ago such as the ones on her book Vision and Difference 1988, are still influential and studied till this day since many of her remarks apply to modern day contemporary concerns such as the political subtexts that women are still portrayed with in advertising.

Life and work
Pollock was born in Bloemfontein, South Africa to Alan Winton Seton Pollock and Kathleen Alexandra (née Sinclair), Griselda Pollock grew up in both French and English Canada. Moving to Britain during her teens, Pollock studied Modern History at Oxford (1967–1970) and History of European Art at the Courtauld Institute of Art (1970–72). She received her doctorate in 1980 for a study of Vincent van Gogh and Dutch Art: A reading of his notions of the modern. After teaching at Reading and Manchester universities, Pollock joined the University of Leeds in 1977 as lecturer in History of Art and Film and was appointed to a Personal Chair in Social and Critical Histories of Art in 1990. In 2001, she became Director of the Centre for Cultural Analysis, Theory and History at the University of Leeds, where she is Professor of Social and Critical Histories of Art. She was awarded an honorary doctorate by the Courtauld Institute in 2019, together with Daniella Luxembourg, and delivered the graduation speech. The Estonian Academy of Art also awarded her an Honorary Doctorate in 2019 and gave a keynote lecture: "Why do we still love Vincent?" On March 5, 2020, Pollock was named as the 2020 Holberg Prize Laureate "for her groundbreaking contributions to feminist art history and cultural studies."

Art history
Pollock's interest and involvement in the women's movement motivated her to create change in the world of art history and its perception of women. This change  was attempted by many researchers before her was only possible due to her innovative approaches observed in her book Vision and Difference, 1988. In this book, she identifies the world's political system to be the main issue with women's depiction. She does this by explaining the relationship between systems of representation and ideology which, in turn, divulge the visual language used by political advertising to depict women in society. The knowledge of these strategies of representation brought the possibility for feminist activists to implement the change necessary to the construction of women in art and as seen today, in society in general.

Her work challenges mainstream models of art and art history that have previously excluded the role of women in art. She examines the interaction of the social categories of gender, class, and race, crucially researching the relationship between these categories, psychoanalysis, and art, drawing on the work of such French cultural theorists as Michel Foucault. Her theorization of subjectivity takes both psychoanalysis and Foucault's ideas about social control into account. 

A range of concepts developed by Pollock which serve to theorize and practice critical feminist interventions in art's histories are: old mistresses, vision and difference, avant-garde gambits, generations and geographies, differencing the canon and most recently, the virtual feminist museum.

Cultural studies and cultural analysis
Pollock is the founding director of the Centre for Cultural Analysis, Theory, and History at the University of Leeds. Initiated with a grant from the then AHRB in 2001, CentreCATH is a transdisciplinary project connecting fine art, histories of art and cultural studies across the shared engagements with class, gender, sexuality, post-colonial critique, and queer theory. In 2007, with Max Silverman, Pollock initiated the research project "Concentrationary Memories: The Politics of Representation", which explores the concept of an anxious and vigilant form of cultural memory analyzing the devastating effects of the totalitarian assault on the human condition and alert to the persistent not only of this perpetual threat but is invasion of popular culture. The project explored the forms of aesthetic resistance to totalitarian terror. Four edited collections have been produced: Concentrationary Cinema: Aesthetics and Political Resistance in Night and Fog by Alain Resnais (London and New York: Berghan 2011), which won the 2011 Fraszna-Krausz Prize for Best Book on the Moving Image; Concentrationary Memory: Totalitarian Terror and Cultural Resistance (London: I B Tauris, 2013), Concentrationary Imaginaries: Tracing Totalitarian Violence in Popular Culture (London: I B Tauris, 2015) and  Concentrationary Art: Jean Cayrol, the Lazarean and the Everyday in Post-war Film, Literature, Music and the Visual Arts (Berghahn, 2019).

Publications
Millet, London: Oresko Books, 1977.
(with Fred Orton) Vincent van Gogh: Artist of his Time, Oxford: Phaidon Press, 1978; US-edition: E. P. Dutton  . Edited and re-published in: Orton & Pollock 1996, pp. 3–51
(with Fred Orton) "Les Données Bretonnantes: La Prairie de Représentation", in: Art History III/3, 1980, pp. 314–344. Reprinted in: Orton & Pollock 1996, pp. 53–88
Mary Cassatt,  London: Jupiter Books, 1980
"Artists mythologies and media genius, madness and art history", in: Screen XXI/3, 1980, pp. 57–96            
Vincent van Gogh in zijn Hollandse jaren: Kijk op stad en land door Van Gogh en zijn tijdgenoten 1870–1890, exh. cat. Amsterdam, Rijksmuseum Vincent van Gogh, 1980/1981 (no ISBN)
Old Mistresses; Women, Art and Ideology, London: Routledge & Kegan (Griselda Pollock with Rozsika Parker), 1981. Reissued by I.B. Tauris in 2013.
(with Fred Orton) "Cloisonism?", in: Art History V/3, 1982, pp. 341–348. Reprinted in: Orton & Pollock, 1996, pp. 115–124
The Journals of Marie Bashkirtseff, London: Virago (newly introduced with Rozsika Parker), 1985.
Framing Feminism: Art & the Women’ s Movement 1970–85 (Griselda Pollock with Rozsika Parker), 1987.
Vision and Difference: [Femininity, Feminism, and Histories of Art], London: Routledge, and New York: Methuen, 1987.
"Inscriptions in the Feminine". In Catherine de Zegher (ed.), Inside the Visible. MIT, 1996. 67–87.
Agency and the Avant-Garde: Studies in Authorship and History by Way of Van Gogh, in Block 1989/15, pp. 5–15. Reprinted in: Orton & Pollock 1996, pp. 315–342
"Oeuvres Autistes." In: Versus 3, 1994, pp. 14–18
 (Edited with Richard Kendall)Dealing with Degas: Representations of Women and the Politics of Vision. London: Pandora Books, 1992 (now Rivers Oram Press).
Avant-Garde Gambits: Gender and the Colour of Art History, London: Thames and Hudson, 1993.
 
(Edited), Generations and Geographies: Critical Theories and Critical Practices in Feminism and the Visual Arts, Routledge, 1996. 
(with Fred Orton) Avant-Gardes and Partisans Reviewed, Manchester University Press, 1996. 
The Ambivalence of Pleasure, Getty Art History Oral Documentation Project, interview by Richard Cándida Smith, Getty Research Institute, 1997.
Mary Cassatt Painter of Modern Women, London: Thames & Hudson: World of Art, 1998.
(Edited with Richard Thomson), On not seeing Provence: Van Gogh and the landscape of consolation, 1888–1889, in: Framing France: The representation of landscape in France, 1870–1914, Manchester University Press, 1998, pp. 81–118  
Aesthetics. Politics. Ethics Julia Kristeva 1966–96, Special Issue Guest Edited parallax, no. 8, 1998.
Differencing the Canon: Feminism and the Histories of Art, London: Routledge, 1999.
Looking Back to the Future: Essays by Griselda Pollock from the 1990s, New York: G&B New Arts, introduced by Penny Florence, 2000. .
(Edited with Valerie Mainz), Work and the Image, 2 vols. London: Ashgate Press, 2000.
Vision and Difference: Feminism, Femininity and the Histories of Art (Chapter 1: Feminist interventions in the histories of art: an introduction, Chapter 3: Modernity and the spaces of femininity), Routledge Classics, 2003.
(Edited), Psychoanalysis and the Image, Boston and Oxford: Blackwell, 2006. 
A Very Long Engagement: Singularity and Difference in the Critical Writing on Eva Hesse in Griselda Pollock with Vanessa Corby (eds), Encountering Eva Hesse, London and Munich: Prestel, 2006.
(Edited with Joyce Zemans), Museums after Modernism, Boston: Blackwells, 2007.
Encounters in the Virtual Feminist Museum: Time, Space and the Archive, London: Routledge, 2007. 
(Edited, with Victoria Turvey-Sauron), The Sacred and the Feminine, London: I.B. Tauris, 2008.
 
Digital and Other Virtualities: Renegotiating the Image, edited by Griselda Pollock and Antony Bryant, I.B. Tauris, 2010. 9781845115685.
After-effects/After-images: Trauma and aesthetic transformation in the Virtual Feminist Museum, Manchester: Manchester University Press, 2013. 978-0-7190-8798-1
 
 Charlotte Salomon and the Theatre of Memory, Yale University Press, 2018. .
 Bracha L Ettinger, Matrixial Subjectivity, Aesthetics and Ethics edited by Griselda Pollock. Palgrave MacMillan, 2020.978-1-137-34515-8

See also

Art history
Avant-garde
Gender studies
Feminist art movement in the United States
Feminist film theory
Feminist theory
Film theory
Cultural studies
Women's history

References

External links
Personal page at the University of Leeds Website
Interview in Documenta Magazine
On Psychoanalysis and the Image 
Griselda Pollock discusses the life and work of artist Charlotte Salomon Griselda Pollock on Charlotte Salomon
UCL History of Art: Griselda Pollock – Making Feminist Memories – Part 2 Griselda Pollock on Helen Rosenau at UCL
UCL History of Art: Griselda Pollock – Making Feminist Memories – Part 1
Marilyn Monroe | La donna oltre il mito – Griselda Pollock Griselda Pollock on Marilyn Monroe Exhibition in Turin
Son[i]a #254. Griselda Pollock | Radio Web MACBA | RWM Podcasts Conversation with Griselda Pollock about her involvement in the Women's Movement in England in the seventies, and about the points of convergence between feminism and art history.
Bow Down: Women in Art Down: Women in Art (Frieze) Podcast on Vera Frenkel
The Great Women Artists: Griselda Pollock on Alina Szapocznikow on Apple Podcasts Griselda Pollock talking to Katy Hessel on Alina Szapocznikow

1949 births
Living people
Women's historians
South African emigrants to Canada
Canadian emigrants to England
Alumni of the University of Oxford
Feminist artists
Women art historians
British art historians
Feminist historians
Feminist studies scholars
British feminist writers
Feminist theorists
Philosophers of sexuality
Postmodern feminists
Jewish feminists
Jewish philosophers
Academics of the University of Leeds
British women historians
Holberg Prize laureates
Slade Professors of Fine Art (University of Cambridge)